Omakase is the third studio album by the dance band Electric Company. It was released in 1999 on Vinyl Communications.

Track listing

Personnel 
Brad Laner – instruments, production

References 

1999 albums
Electric Company (band) albums